Tourism is travel for pleasure or business.

Tourism may also refer to:

 Tourism (constituency), a functional constituency in the elections for the Legislative Council of Hong Kong
 Tourism (Leftfield album), a live album by the English electronic music group Leftfield
 Tourism (Roxette album), a studio album by pop duo Roxette
 Tourism (film), a 2017 pseudo-documentary film by Daisuke Miyazaki

See also
 Tourist (disambiguation)
 Touring (disambiguation)